Ludovic Roy (born 18 August 1977) is a French former professional footballer who played as a goalkeeper. Roy spent his entire professional career in Scotland, most notably having started at St Mirren.

Club career

Early days
Roy spent his youth career in his native France with La Berrichonne de Châteauroux.

St Mirren
Roy arrived in Scotland at the start of the 1998–99 season, joining St Mirren from La Berrichonne de Châteauroux in France. Roy was a member of the squad that won promotion to the SPL at the end of season 1999–2000.

During 2002 Roy had a short loan spell at St Johnstone where he made 2 league appearances before returning to Love Street for the start of season 2002–03.

Roy stayed with St Mirren for 5 seasons and in total made 122 league appearances.

Ayr United
Roy signed for Ayr United at the start of the 2003–04 season and spent 2 seasons with the Somerset Park club and in total made 57 league appearances.

Livingston
Roy signed for Livingston at the start of the 2005–06 season. Roy only made 6 league appearances in his one season at Almondvale.

Dundee
Roy signed for Dundee at the start of the 2006–07 season and made his first appearance for the club in a pre-season friendly at Forfar Athletic.

However, he suffered a rib injury in his first competitive match on the opening day of the season against Partick Thistle and missed the early part of the campaign as a consequence. Roy failed to have his contract renewed when it expired at the end of the 2008–09 season.

Roy made 37 league appearances for the Dens Park club during his 3 seasons at Dundee.

Queen of the South
Roy was signed by Gordon Chisholm for Dumfries club Queen of the South on 29 May 2009 for the start of the 2009–10 season. Roy signed a one-year contract with the Palmerston club.

In competition with David Hutton for the goalkeeper's jersey, Roy made 7 appearances for Queens (in league and cup) before picking up a hip injury on 26 September 2009.

After a lengthy hip injury lay-off, Roy appeared as an unused substitute goalkeeper for Queens on 6 April 2010 at Victoria Park, Dingwall for the match versus Ross County, as cover for Scott Fox. The match ended in a 1–1 draw.

Roy was released by Queens at the end of the 2009–10 season.

Cowdenbeath
He signed for Cowdenbeath in 2010 where he served as goalkeeper coach as well as a player.

Raith Rovers
At the start of November 2011 Roy went on a trial to Raith Rovers and was included in the squad as a substitute in all their matches since then until 1 December 2011 when he signed a contract with the club.

In January 2012 his contract expired and he left the club.

After playing
He is now a businessman, having set up a personal fitness company.

International career
Roy has represented France at U-15, 16, 17 and 18 levels.

References

External links
 
 Raith Rovers player profile

1977 births
Sportspeople from Tours, France
Living people
Association football goalkeepers
French footballers
French expatriate footballers
Expatriate footballers in Scotland
LB Châteauroux players
St Mirren F.C. players
St Johnstone F.C. players
Ayr United F.C. players
Livingston F.C. players
Dundee F.C. players
Queen of the South F.C. players
Raith Rovers F.C. players
Scottish Football League players
Scottish Premier League players
French expatriate sportspeople in Scotland
Footballers from Centre-Val de Loire